Farajollah Mizani, also known by pseudonym and pen name Javanshir, was an Iranian communist and a senior Tudeh Party member.

Early life and education 
Mizani was born in 1925 in Tabriz. He studied engineering at University of Tehran. Years later he was graduated with a PhD in Persian literature from a Soviet university.

Career 
Mizani joined Tudeh Party in 1945, while he was a university student. In 1957, he fled to the Soviet Union and was exiled until 1979. While there, for some time he headed the party's clandestine radio named Peyk-e-Iran and studied at university. After Iranian Revolution, he returned to Iran and was a member of the party's central committee. In 1983, he was arrested by the Islamic Republic government and put on trial. He was among those who were killed during 1988 executions of Iranian political prisoners.

References 

1925 births
1988 deaths
University of Tehran alumni
Second Secretaries of Tudeh Party of Iran
Central Committee of the Tudeh Party of Iran members
People from Tabriz
Iranian people convicted of spying for the Soviet Union
Iranian prisoners and detainees
20th-century executions by Iran
Iranian expatriates in the Soviet Union
Executed communists